Zlobin, Żłobin or Zhlobin may refer to
Żłobin, Podlaskie Voivodeship, a village in north-eastern Poland
Zhlobin, a city in Belarus
Zhlobin District
FC Zhlobin, an association football club based in Zhlobin
Metallurg Zhlobin, an ice hockey club based in Zhlobin
Zlobin (surname)